The CSV qualification for the 2018 FIVB Volleyball Men's World Championship saw member nations compete for two places at the finals in Italy and Bulgaria. The 2017 Men's South American champions, plus one team from the qualification tournament qualified for the 2018 World Championship.

Pool standing procedure
 Number of matches won
 Match points
 Sets ratio
 Points ratio
 If the tie continues as per the point ratio between two teams, the priority will be given to the team which won the last match between them. When the tie in points ratio is between three or more teams, a new classification of these teams in the terms of points 1, 2 and 3 will be made taking into consideration only the matches in which they were opposed to each other.

Match won 3–0 or 3–1: 3 match points for the winner, 0 match points for the loser
Match won 3–2: 2 match points for the winner, 1 match point for the loser

2017 South American Championship

Venues:  Centro Nacional de Entrenamiento Olímpico, Santiago, Chile and  Gimnasio Olímpico Regional UFRO, Temuco, Chile
Dates: 7–11 August 2017
The champions qualified for the 2018 World Championship, whereas the second and third ranked teams except the qualification tournament hosts Argentina qualified for the qualification tournament.

Qualification tournament
Venues:  Estadio Nestor Kirchner, Palpalá, Argentina (30 August) and  Polideportivo Delmi, Salta, Argentina (1–2 September)
Dates: 30 August – 2 September 2017
All times are Argentina Time (UTC−03:00).
The winners qualified for the 2018 World Championship.

|}

|}

References

External links
Official website of the Qualification Tournament

2018 FIVB Volleyball Men's World Championship
2017 in men's volleyball